Kuybyshevo is the name of several rural localities in Russia:
Kuybyshevo, Krasnoshchyokovsky District, Altai Krai, a selo in Kuybyshevsky Selsoviet of Krasnoshchyokovsky District in Altai Krai; 
Kuybyshevo, Rubtsovsky District, Altai Krai, a settlement in Kuybyshevsky Selsoviet of Rubtsovsky District in Altai Krai; 
Kuybyshevo, Uglovsky District, Altai Krai, a selo in Kruglyansky Selsoviet of Uglovsky District in Altai Krai; 
Kuybyshevo, Republic of Dagestan, a selo in Kalinovsky Selsoviet of Tarumovsky District in the Republic of Dagestan; 
Kuybyshevo, Republic of Khakassia, a selo in Kuybyshevsky Selsoviet of Beysky District in the Republic of Khakassia
Kuybyshevo, Rostov Oblast, a selo in Kuybyshevskoye Rural Settlement of Kuybyshevsky District in Rostov Oblast